Ballerup Kommune is a municipality in Region Hovedstaden on the island of Zealand (Sjælland) in eastern Denmark. It is located approximately 15 kilometers from central Copenhagen. The municipality covers an area of 34.09 km², and has a population of 49,274 (1. January 2022). It is also the name of the municipal seat, Ballerup.

Overview
As of November 2020, the mayor is Jesper Würtzen of the Social Democrats.

Other than Ballerup, the towns that make up the municipality are Måløv and Skovlunde.

Neighboring municipalities are Herlev to the east, Furesø to the north, Egedal to the west, and Albertslund and Glostrup to the south.

The geography of Ballerup municipality was not affected on January 1, 2007, by the nationwide Kommunalreformen ("The Municipal Reform" of 2007).

Economy
The municipality is home to companies such as GN Store Nord, Orbicon and Leo Pharma and Toms International.

Politics

Municipal council
Ballerup's municipal council consists of 25 members, elected every four years.

Below are the municipal councils elected since the Municipal Reform of 2007.

Twin towns – sister cities

Ballerup is twinned with:
 Brandenburg an der Havel, Germany 
 East Kilbride, Scotland, United Kingdom

Ballerup also cooperates with Ystad in Sweden.

See also 
 Ballerup station
 Ballerup Bladet

References 
 Municipal statistics: NetBorger Kommunefakta, delivered from KMD aka Kommunedata (Municipal Data)
 Municipal mergers and neighbors: Eniro new municipalities map

External links 

Municipality's official website
East Kilbride, Ballerup's twin town

 
Municipalities in the Capital Region of Denmark
Municipalities of Denmark
Copenhagen metropolitan area